The  is a Tendai sect Buddhist temple located in the city of Ueda, Nagano, Japan. Its honzon is Yakushi Nyōrai. It is the successor to the Nara period kokubunji National Temples established by Emperor Shōmu for the purpose of promoting Buddhism as the national religion of Japan and standardising control of the Yamato rule to the provinces. The archaeological site with the ruins of the ancient temple grounds for the provincial temple and its associated provincial nunnery was collectively designated as a National Historic Site in 1974.

History

The Shinano Kokubun-ji is located in the Ueda Basin on the north bank of the Chikuma River, with the ruins of the ancient Shinano Kokubun-ji located 300 meters to the south of the current temple. It is believed that the ancient provincial capital of Shinano Province was located nearby; however, archaeological excavations indicate that the Kokubun-ji ruins are not the original Nara-period provincial temple, but are an early Heian period reconstruction. The exact date of this Heian period foundation is uncertain, and traces of a fire lend some credence to temple legend that it was burned down in a battle between the armies of the central government and the forces of the rebel Taira no Masakado in 938 AD. Many other provincial temples around the country were destroyed during this period, due to a decline in the authority of the central government and rise of competing local warlords.

The ruins of the ancient Shinano Kokubun-ji are a square enclosure measuring 176.56 meters east-to-west by 178.05 meters north-to-south. Within this enclosure, the foundation stones for a Kondō, Lecture Hall, Great South Gate, Middle Gate and Pagoda, with a surrounding Cloister and priest's residence have been preserved. The layout mirrors that of the Tōdai-ji in Nara, the head temple of the kokubunji system, with the main buildings lined up in a single file from south to north, with the cloister connecting the Middle Gate and the Lecture Hall, and the pagoda located to the southeast of the Kondō.

These ruins were adjacent to the Kokubun-niiji, or Provincial nunnery, whose layout was almost identical, but on a slightly smaller scale, with the enclosure measuring 148 meters square. The two sites today are separated by a railroad line, but both are preserved as part of an archaeological park. Two kiln ruins have been discovered some 200 meters northeast of these ruins, where the roof tiles used for both of these temple were made.

It is located about a five-minute walk from Shinano-Kokubunji Station on the Shinano Railway.

Current situation
The origins of the modern successor to the Shinano Kokubun-ji are not certain. Per the Azuma Kagami, Minamoto no Yoritomo made a pilgrimage to Zenko-ji in Nagano and made a vow to rebuild the pagoda of the Shinano Kokubun-ji. A three-story pagoda was not actually completed until 1480, in the Muromachi period, but from a stone monument and some Kamakura period artifacts found in the temple precincts, it appears that reconstruction began in the Kamakura period at a site 300 meters to the north of the Heian period temple.

The three-story pagoda was destroyed by lightning around 1585, which was the year that the local warlord Sanada Masayuki defeated the Tokugawa clan at the Battle of Ueda. In 1600, during the Siege of Ueda, Sanada Masayuki met with Tokugawa Hidetada at the Shinano Kokubun-ji for negotiations on possible capitulation as part of his delaying strategy to prevent Tokugawa Hidetada's forces from arriving on the field of battle in time for the Battle of Sekigahara.

In the Edo Period, the temple was revived with the assistance of the various daimyō of Ueda Domain under the Tokugawa shogunate and a number of buildings were repaired or reconstructed, including the Three-story pagoda.  It houses a statue of Dainichi Nyōrai and the structure is designed as a National Important Cultural Property.  Seasonal fairs held at the temple helped maintain its revenues.  The present main hall, a Yakushi-dō was completed in 1860. It has two sets of eaves, giving it the outward appearance of a two-story structure, but the building interior has only single story. It is designed as a Nagano Prefecture Important Cultural Property.

Gallery

See also
List of Historic Sites of Japan (Nagano)
provincial temple

References

External links

 Ueda City official site 
Ueda City tourist information site 

Historic Sites of Japan
Ueda, Nagano
Shinano Province
9th-century establishments in Japan
Heian period
Archaeological sites in Japan
Tendai temples
9th-century Buddhist temples
Buddhist archaeological sites in Japan
Gion faith